Samuel Benedict (1792–1854) was a Liberian politician and jurist who served as the 1st Chief Justice of Liberia. He was born a slave in the U.S. state of Georgia in 1792, and purchased his freedom and that of his family. He emigrated to Liberia in 1835, on the ship Indiana.

Prior to Liberia's independence, Benedict was a judge of the Superior Court and a merchant. He later presided over the Liberian Constitutional Convention of 1847, which officially provided Liberia's independence from the American Colonization Society. He was one of Montserrado County's delegates at the convention and a signer of the Liberian Declaration of Independence.

Representing the Anti-Administration Party (AAP), Benedict was defeated by longtime political foe Joseph Jenkins Roberts in the 1847 election to serve as Liberia's first president.

Benedict later became the first Chief Justice of the Liberian Supreme Court. He died in 1854.

References

Chief justices of Liberia
Americo-Liberian people
1792 births
1854 deaths
People from Georgia (U.S. state)
18th-century American slaves
People from Montserrado County
Signatories of the Liberian Declaration of Independence
19th-century Liberian judges